Tammy van Wisse (born 23 July 1968 in Melbourne, Victoria) is a long-distance swimmer from Australia. 1990 she won the Lake Zurich Swim. As a marathon swimmer she swam the Murray River in 2001, a distance of 2,438 kilometres and the English Channel in 1993 in a time of 8h 35mins and again in 1994 in a time of 8h 33mins. In July 2006, van Wisse broke an 81-year-old record (held by Gertrude Jacobs Ederle) for the 35-mile swim from New York City to Sandy Hook, and retired from competitive swimming the same year to start a family, 20 years after her first marathon swim. She now works as an environmentalist and a motivational speaker.

References

External links 
Tammy van Wisse - Official Website

1968 births
Living people
Australian female swimmers
Female long-distance swimmers
American motivational speakers
Women motivational speakers
Sportswomen from Victoria (Australia)
Australian people of Dutch descent
Swimmers from Melbourne